Hemarthrosis is a bleeding into joint spaces. It is a common feature of hemophilia.

Causes
It usually follows injury but occurs mainly in patients with a predisposition to hemorrhage such as those being treated with warfarin (or other anticoagulants) and patients with hemophilia.

It can be associated with knee joint arthroplasty.

It has also been reported as a part of hemorrhagic syndrome in the Crimean-Congo Hemorrhagic Fever, suggesting a viral cause to the bleeding in a joint space.

Diagnosis

Hemarthrosis is diagnosed through the methods listed below:

A physical examination is the first step, the joints of the patient are moved and bent to study the functioning.

Synovial Fluid analysis is another method to diagnose Hemarthrosis. It involves a small needle being inserted into the joint to draw the fluid. Reddish-colored hue of the sample is an indication of the blood being present. Imaging tests are normally done. The tests also include MRI, Ultrasound and X-ray test, which give better information about the joint inflammation. Although MRI is superior method for this assessment, the US using the HEAD-US method performed by paediatric radiologists is a reliable tool for detection and quantification of haemophilic arthropathy in children in comparison to MRI.

Treatment
In hemophilia it may occur spontaneously, and recurrent hemarthroses are a major cause of disability in that patient group due to hemophilic arthropathy, requiring synovectomy, joint replacement and increased medical therapy to prevent further bleeding episodes.

Reducing hemarthroses events using intravenous administration of blood clotting factor concentrate on a regular basis starting in early childhood, reduces joint deterioration and increases the person's quality of life compared to "on demand" treatment (treating after a bleed). The minimal effective dose and best dosage frequency have not been established. It is not clear, due to lack of sufficient data, if preventative therapy with clotting factor concentrate is also effective at reducing joint deterioration if treatment is started after joint damage has occurred.

Complications
Up to a quarter of all severe ligament or capsular knee injuries leading to a hemarthrosis are associated with cartilage damage that can lead to progressive degenerative arthritis.

References

External links 

Arthropathies
Bleeding